Mirko Jovanović (born 14 March 1971) is a Serbian football coach and former player who played as a forward.

Club career
In July 1999, Jovanović joined K League side Jeonbuk Hyundai Motors. After that, he signed for Créteil-Lusitanos.

References

External links
 
 

1971 births
Living people
Footballers from Novi Sad
Yugoslav footballers
Serbian footballers
Association football forwards
FK Vojvodina players
FK Mačva Šabac players
FC VSS Košice players
Budapest Honvéd FC players
Jeonbuk Hyundai Motors players
US Créteil-Lusitanos players
K League 1 players
Serbian football managers
FK Proleter Novi Sad managers
RFK Novi Sad 1921 managers
FK TSC Bačka Topola managers
Serbian expatriate footballers
Serbian expatriate sportspeople in Slovakia
Serbian expatriate sportspeople in Hungary
Serbian expatriate sportspeople in South Korea
Serbian expatriate sportspeople in France
Expatriate footballers in Slovakia
Expatriate footballers in Hungary
Expatriate footballers in South Korea
Expatriate footballers in France
OFK Bačka players
FK Spartak Subotica players